The Irish Peatland Conservation Council (IPCC) is a national charitable organisation established in 1982 to conserve and protect a representative sample of Irish bogs, and to campaign on bog-related issues.

History
Having been for many years in Dublin city centre, the Council's headquarters are currently located at the Bog of Allen Nature Centre, Lullymore, Rathangan, Co. Kildare.

Objectives
IPCC's conservation aims and objectives are set out in a series of Action Plans, the most recent being Bogs and Fens of Ireland Conservation Plan 2005. An account of the first fifteen years of the Save the Bogs Campaign is contained in Save the Bogs Story, with all IPCC publications orderable through the charity's website .  IPCC also produces a twice-yearly campaign newsletter Peatland News which goes out to Friends of the Bog.

The IPCC is a registered charity, It is not state-funded and so relies on public support to ensure its independence and influence. The IPCC is a member of the Irish Environmental Network, a network of Ireland's environmental NGOs.

See also

2003 Derrybrien landslide

External links
 Official website

References

Conservation in the Republic of Ireland
Environmental organisations based in Ireland
Wetlands organizations
Non-profit organisations based in the Republic of Ireland
1982 establishments in Ireland